Stuart Joel Nuggett (Kirriyangunji) is a Jingili country musician based in Alice Springs, Australia. He speaks Mudbura and Jingulu languages.

Career 

Originally from Elliott (Kulumindini), Northern Territory, Nugget was front man for the rock band, Storm Riders. The band also included Samuel Sandy and Jason Bill of Kulumindini Band, with Farryl Jones, Terrance Cooper, and Clifford Campbell. In 2002 Storm Riders released a five-track extended play (EP), Waiting on a Miracle, and played 2014's Merrepen Festival.

Nuggett was taught Jingulu by his mother Janet Sandy-Gregory who was one of four fluent speakers of the language. In 2019 he released Stuart Nuggett, a five-track EP, featuring music in the Jingulu language on CAAMA Music. It was performed at the First Nations Media Awards and National Live Music Awards. His song "Nayurni" (woman) was nominated for the Indigenous Language Award of the Year award at the National Indigenous Music Awards (NIMAs).

Following the release of his EP, Nuggett was signed to CAAMA Music, which released his debut album Ngaaya-Ma Jingila Baaya in October 2020. The album is in both Jingulu and English, and two of its tracks were nominated for the NIMAs in 2021.

In 2019 Nuggett was one of several First Nations people who protested Origin Energy's fracking the Betaloo Basin area. He highlighted concerns over a lack of information over effects to the environment.

Awards and nominations

National Indigenous Music Awards

References 

Indigenous Australian musicians
Year of birth missing (living people)
Musicians from the Northern Territory
Australian male singers
Living people
Australian country musicians